Karunarathna Paranawithana (born 2 June 1968) is a Sri Lankan politician, current member of parliament for Ratnapura district and deputy minister of Provincial Council and Local Government. He previously served as secretary to the Ministry of Mass Media before resigning to contest from UNP-led alliance the UNFGG in the parliamentary polls.

See also
List of Sri Lankan non-career Permanent Secretaries

References 

Living people
Members of the 15th Parliament of Sri Lanka
Government ministers of Sri Lanka
United National Party politicians
1968 births